The 2015 Just Retirement World Indoor Bowls Championship was held at Potters Leisure Resort, Hopton on Sea, Great Yarmouth, England, from 09-25 January 2015. The men's singles title was won for a record-extending sixth time by Scotland's Alex Marshall, who beat Andy Thomson in the final.

Robert Paxton & Simon Skelton won their first Pairs title, stopping Alex Marshall & Paul Foster from winning a fourth title.

Robert Paxton & Marion Purcell won their first Mixed Pairs title, stopping Paul Foster & Laura Thomas from winning a third consecutive title.

Laura Thomas won her first title, defeating defending champion Katherine Rednall in the final.

Winners

Draw and results

Men's singles

Women's singles

Men's Pairs

Mixed Pairs

References

External links
Official website

World Indoor Bowls Championship
2015 in bowls
2015 in English sport
International sports competitions hosted by England